Adeps may refer to:
 Adeps, a genus of beetles in the family Tenebrionidae, synonym of Adepsion
 Adeps, a genus of amphipods in the family Corophiidae, synonym of Audouinia
 adeps lanae, greasy substance

See also
 ADEPS